Paolo Cecchetto (born 19 July 1967) is an Italian paralympic cyclist who won a gold medal at the Summer Paralympics.

See also
Italy at the 2020 Summer Paralympics

References

External links
 

1967 births
Living people
Paralympic cyclists of Italy
Paralympic medalists in cycling
Paralympic gold medalists for Italy
Medalists at the 2016 Summer Paralympics
Medalists at the 2020 Summer Paralympics
Cyclists at the 2012 Summer Paralympics
Cyclists at the 2016 Summer Paralympics
Cyclists at the 2020 Summer Paralympics
20th-century Italian people
21st-century Italian people